Cole Harbour 30 is a Mi'kmaq reserve located in Nova Scotia, Canada, in the Halifax Regional Municipality.

It is administratively part of the Millbrook First Nation.

Indian reserves in Nova Scotia
Communities in Halifax County, Nova Scotia
Mi'kmaq in Canada